The Football Lottery (Spanish: La quiniela) is a 1960 Spanish comedy film directed by Ana Mariscal.

Cast 
 Rafaela Aparicio 
 José Calvo 
 Raúl Cancio 
 Félix Dafauce
 Rafael Durán 
 Félix Fernández 
 Ana Mariscal 
 Manuel Monroy 
 Erasmo Pascual 
 Manuel Peiró 
 Joaquín Roa 
 Ángel Álvarez

References

Bibliography 
 Timothy J. Ashton. Soccer in Spain: Politics, Literature, and Film. Scarecrow Press, 2013.

External links 
 

1960 comedy films
Spanish comedy films
1960 films
1960s Spanish-language films
Films directed by Ana Mariscal
Films with screenplays by Antonio de Lara
1960s Spanish films